Olerich is a surname. Notable people with the surname include:

Dave Olerich (born 1944), American football player
Henry Olerich (1851–1927), American writer